Special Powers Act, 1974 is a law of Bangladesh. The law allows the government of Bangladesh to detain people indefinitely without charging them with anything.

History
The law was passed in 1974 to replace the repealed Security Act of Pakistan,1952, the Public Safety Ordinance of 1958 and the Bangladesh Scheduled Offences (Special Tribunal) Order of 1972. The law targets smuggling, hoarding, and damaging actions. The law allows the government to detain on preventive ground. Awami League dominated Bangladesh Parliament passed the law on 9 February 1974.  The Awami League was criticised for passing the law. The law was opposed by Ataur Rahman Khan and Abdus Sattar. Individuals can be up to six months without being charged and indefinitely if endorsed by the advisory board. Bangladesh Nationalist Party maintained it when they came to power despite promising to remove it in their election manifesto. Sheikh Hasina called for its removal but after becoming Prime Minister called it useful.

In 1990, section 16(2) of the act was repealed through an amendment but police were filing cases under the section into 2018. Bangladesh High Court ordered police to stop using the section since it was removed through an act of parliament.

In December 2020, Bangladesh Police charged four under the act for vandalizing a statue of Sheikh Mujibur Rahman. In 2022, the government was asked to use the act to take action against food hoarding by traders.

Criticism 
In 2022, Bangladesh Jamaat-e-Islami has called for the law to be repealed along with Anti-Terrorism Act, 2009 and Digital Security Act, 2018. Bangladesh Nationalist Party has called for the removal of the law in 2022. An editorial in The Daily Star described the law as "draconian" used by governments to harass their political opponents. Human Rights Watch has urged the government to repeal the Special Powers Act.

References

Law of Bangladesh
Censorship in Bangladesh
Freedom of the press
1974 in law